Maine Coast is an 1896 painting by American artist Winslow Homer. It is part of the collection of the Metropolitan Museum of Art in New York.

The painting is a seaward view from the cliffs at Prouts Neck, Scarborough, Maine on a stormy day. A powerful wave is about to crash onto the black rocks below in a mass of white foam.

The work is on view in the Metropolitan Museum's Gallery 767.

See also
 1901 in art
 List of works by Frederic Edwin Church

References

1896 paintings
Maritime paintings
Paintings by Winslow Homer
Paintings in the collection of the Metropolitan Museum of Art